Princess Allura, known as  in the original Japanese language Beast King GoLion, is a fictional character in the media franchise Voltron and member of the Voltron Force, who made her first appearance in Voltron.

Voltron: Defender of the Universe

Princess Allura is ruler of Planet Altea and last surviving member of royal family after the death of her father King Alfor. She became the pilot the Blue Lion of Voltron after Sven became no longer able to do so. She has highly intelligent mice that can understand human speech. She is also stalked by Prince Lotor for her affection.

Voltron: Legendary Defender

In Voltron: Legendary Defender, Allura was the princess of Altea, the daughter of king Alfor and last surviving female member of the Altean race. She was asleep in the Castle of Lions with her servant Coran for 10,000 years, and commanded and piloted the Blue Lion of Voltron, until she sacrificed herself for the galaxy in the series finale.

Conception
In the Voltron: Legendary Defender, Princess Allura is not initially a member of the Voltron force. But after the "disappearance" of Shiro, with Keith becoming the Black Pilot and Lance taking Keith's place as Red Pilot, Allura, to complete the Voltron team, is chosen as the Blue Pilot, and in Voltron Force she became an aunt to a spunky, bold and fearless, long orange-haired, martial arts-loving, school-hating girl named Larmina.

Design
In the classic version of Voltron, Allura was depicted as either Altean or Arusian depending on the region the anime was aired. Also, she was depicted as having fair skin and blonde hair. In Legendary Defender, she was depicted as Altean, and was re-imagined as being dark skinned with white hair (likely so she was distinguishable from her human allies) and, unlike the rest of the main cast, spoke with a British accent.

Comics

In the 2011 Devil's Due comics, the character Allura is portrayed as a teenager. The comic book version of Allura places her at age 19, and depicts her with a much stronger backbone than her cartoon counterpart. When her home planet Arus was ravaged by the forces of Zarkon and her parents murdered by Zarkon's own hand, she was taken in and raised by Coran, a retired combat instructor in the royal army, and was forced to grow up much too fast. Years later, she would renounce her title of "princess," answering only to "Allura," until her people are liberated from Zarkon's tyranny. Visions while she slept showed the spirit of her father King Alfor promising that five young men would come to Arus in search of the legendary robot Voltron. When Keith, Lance, Hunk, Pidge, and Sven arrive on Arus and speak of the mighty robot, Allura instantly knows that they are the ones spoken of in her visions, and helps them to find the five hidden lions that will unite to form Voltron. When Voltron fails to combine properly due to a brain defect within Sven, Allura mans his Blue Lion, and with her royal Arusian blood, the unification of Voltron is finally a success, and she becomes a member of the Voltron Force. During the course of the comic, she begins to develop feelings towards Keith and vice versa.

Reception
The Legendary Defender incarnation of the character was praised for being diverse.

References

Television characters introduced in 1984
Voltron
Female characters in animation
Fictional characters who use magic
Fictional military personnel
Allura
Fictional women soldiers and warriors
Fictional extraterrestrial characters